A puer mingēns (plural puerī mingentēs ) is a figure in a work of art depicted as a prepubescent boy in the act of urinating, either actual or simulated. The puer mingens could represent anything from whimsy and boyish innocence to erotic symbols of virility and masculine bravado.

Etymology and word play

The term puer mingens come from the Latin puer, meaning "boy", and from the Latin mingens, the present participle of the verb mingere which means "to urinate".

In Latin, verbs for urinating like mingere were frequently employed in the sense of "to ejaculate". This connotation was preserved in various descendents of Latin, including Italian with such words as pisciare. On account of this, the urine emitted from the penis of the puer mingens can be interpreted symbolically as semen; and pueri mingentes are frequently found in works auguring fertility and fecundity. Lorenzo Lotto's Venus and Cupid is an example.

In several languages, such as Italian, French, and English, "to make water" was a euphemism for urinating. In allusion to this, one can find depictions of a puer mingens "making water" in works such as Michelangelo's Children's Bacchanal, or in church lavabos whose waterspouts are positioned in front of naked boys' groins (thereby giving the illusion that their urine has been transformed into water). Pueri mingentes were frequently incorporated as fully functioning statues whose pipes shot forth streams of water out of the statues' penises. One of the most famous examples of this is the Manneken Pis in Brussels.

Renaissance revivals of puer mingens

Pueri mingentes are a classical motif occasionally found in antiquity. Ancient Roman examples of pueri mingentes occurred mainly on children's sarcophagi.

The puer mingens was revived during the Renaissance. Donatello, who paved the way in the reinvention of the larger motif of the putti in sculpture, depicted one of the earliest Renaissance examples of a puer mingens on the base of his Judith and Holofernes statue. From its revival in 1400s Florence, the artistic motif of urinating boys spread throughout the rest of Europe, reaching its height of popularity during the late Renaissance in the sixteenth and seventeenth centuries before gradually receding in popularity.

Pueri mingentes locations 

In Roman times the puer mingens was generally found in depictions of Bacchic rites on children's sarcophagi. From the Renaissance onward, the puer mingens can be found in both secular and religious art and across a range of media, from illuminated manuscripts, functional fountains, frescoes, to apotropaic amulets.

Owing to the abovementioned associations with fertility, pueri mingentes are found on deschi da parto – trays given to pregnant women and those who had recently given birth in order to betoken and celebrate the healthy birth of male offspring. Paintings intended as wedding gifts, such as Lorenzo Lotto's Venus and Cupid, might also feature urinating boys.

The puer mingens was prominently incorporated into fountains that would shoot water out of the statue's penis. Although this artistic motif is Roman in origin, there is scant attestation of working fountains incorporating pueri mingentes in Roman times; the Romans did, however, have functional statues portraying the adult Priapus urinating, which may have inspired the Renaissance development of statues of urinating boys. In addition to public spaces, such as the Manneken Pis's location in central Brussels, functional fountains also graced many private sixteenth- and seventeenth-century gardens across Europe.

Gallery

See also
Putti – Artistic depictions of naked boys
Manneken Pis (1619) – A bronze statue in Brussels of a naked little boy urinating
Tea pet

References

External links 
 

Latin words and phrases
Renaissance art
Visual motifs
Iconography
Phallic monuments
Ornaments